Biceps is a muscle located on the inside of the upper arm.

Biceps may also refer to: 
Biceps (prosody), a point in a metrical pattern
BICEPS, the current treatment route for combat stress reaction employed by the U.S. military
 "Biceps", a 1941 story by Nelson Algren in The Neon Wilderness

See also 
 Bicep (disambiguation)
 Biceps femoris muscle, one of the hamstring muscles of the back of each thigh